Domadice is a village and municipality in the Levice District in the Nitra Region of Slovakia.

History
In historical records the village was first mentioned in 1138. The village belonged to the noble family Dalmady de Dalmad. According to the Urbarium of 1767 many other noble families lived here. These would be included: Halácsy, Bottlik, Pomothy, Bodonyi, Dalmady, Sántha, Sembery, Lehoczky and Szabadhegyi.

Geography
The village lies at an altitude of 168 metres and covers an area of 13.617 km². It has a population of about 266 people.

Ethnicity
The village is approximately 100% Slovak

Facilities
The village has a public library and a football pitch.

Genealogical resources

The records for genealogical research are available at the state archive "Statny Archiv in Nitra, Slovakia"

 Roman Catholic church records (births/marriages/deaths): 1693-1895 (parish B)
 Lutheran church records (births/marriages/deaths): 1746-1896 (parish B)
 Reformated church records (births/marriages/deaths): 1753-1897 (parish B)

See also
 List of municipalities and towns in Slovakia

References

External links
https://web.archive.org/web/20071116010355/http://www.statistics.sk/mosmis/eng/run.html
Surnames of living people in Domadice

Villages and municipalities in Levice District